Tentaoculus eritmetus is a species of small sea snail, a marine gastropod mollusk in the family Pseudococculinidae, the false limpets.

Distribution
This species was found in the Atlantic Ocean off New England, USA.

Description 
The maximum recorded shell length is 5 mm.

Habitat 
Minimum recorded depth is 2654 m. Maximum recorded depth is 2654 m.

References

External links

Pseudococculinidae
Gastropods described in 1884